Seneca M. Dorr (August 14, 1820 – December 3, 1884) was a Vermont lawyer, judge and politician who served as President of the Vermont Senate. He was the husband of author Julia C. R. Dorr.

Biography

Seneca Milo Dorr was born in Chatham Center, New York on August 14, 1820. An acquaintance of Martin Van Buren, he studied law, passed the bar, and practiced in Ghent. In 1857, he moved to Rutland, Vermont, where he practiced law and became active in the marble business. Dorr also became involved in banking and stockbrokerage.

Originally a Democrat, Dorr opposed slavery and as a result joined the Free Soil movement and later became a Republican.

In 1863 Dorr served on the Vermont Council of Censors, and he was a member of the Vermont House of Representatives from 1863 to 1865. From 1865 to 1866, Dorr served in the Vermont Senate, and was the Senate's President pro tempore. From 1876 to 1877, Dorr served as Rutland County Assistant Judge.

Dorr died in Rutland on December 3, 1884. He was buried in Rutland's Evergreen Cemetery.

Family
Seneca Dorr married Julia Caroline Ripley on February 22, 1847. Seneca and Julia Dorr were the parents of Russell, William, Zulma, Joseph (who died in infancy) and Henry.

Julia Dorr's half-brothers and Seneca Dorr's brothers-in-law were Edward H. Ripley and William Y. W. Ripley, both prominent officers in the American Civil War.

References 

1820 births
1884 deaths
People from Chatham, New York
People from Rutland (town), Vermont
New York (state) lawyers
Vermont lawyers
New York (state) Democrats
New York (state) Free Soilers
New York (state) Republicans
Republican Party members of the Vermont House of Representatives
Republican Party Vermont state senators
Presidents pro tempore of the Vermont Senate
Vermont state court judges
People from Ghent, New York
19th-century American judges
19th-century American lawyers
Burials at Evergreen Cemetery (Rutland, Vermont)